The men's freestyle 125 kg is a competition featured at the Golden Grand Prix Ivan Yarygin 2018, and was held in Krasnoyarsk, Russia on the 27th of January.

Medalists

Results
Legend
F — Won by fall
WO — Won by walkover

Final

Top half

qualification: Muradin Kushkhov of Kabardino-Balkaria def. Baldan Tsyzhipov of Buryatia (3-1)
qualification: Alan Khugaev of North Ossetia-Alania def. Alan Khubaev of North Ossetia-Alania (3-0)

Section 1

Bottom half

Section 2

Repechage

References

Men's freestyle 125 kg